Scoparia famularis is a species of moth in the family Crambidae. It is endemic to New Zealand.

Taxonomy
It was described by Alfred Philpott in 1930. However the placement of this species within the genus Scoparia is in doubt. As a result, this species has also been referred to as Scoparia (s.l.) famularis.

References

Moths described in 1930
Moths of New Zealand
Scorparia
Endemic fauna of New Zealand
Endemic moths of New Zealand